Zara Nicole McDermott (born 14 December 1996) is an English media personality. After working for the Department for Education as a policy advisor, she became a contestant on the fourth series of Love Island. She has since appeared on The X Factor: Celebrity and Made in Chelsea and has gone on to present her own BBC documentaries, Revenge Porn, Uncovering Rape Culture and Disordered Eating based on her own experiences. In 2022, she began presenting the dating series Love in the Flesh on BBC Three.

Early and personal life
McDermott was born on 14 December 1996 in the London Borough of Havering, England to Alan and Karen McDermott. In 2009, McDermott, her parents and her younger brother Brad appeared on the BBC television series Wanted Down Under, where they considered moving to Australia. They featured on the show again in 2013, on Wanted Down Under: Revisited, which saw the family discuss why they decided to remain in the United Kingdom. At the age of 14, McDermott was suspended from her secondary school after sending nude photos to a boy. During her time on Love Island, McDermott's nude photos were leaked again. She discussed both incidents in her BBC documentary Revenge Porn.

McDermott previously worked for the Department for Education as a policy advisor. McDermott began dating television personality Sam Thompson in May 2019. A year into the relationship, McDermott cheated on Thompson, however, they later announced that they had got back together.

Career
In June 2018, McDermott became a contestant on the fourth series of Love Island. She entered the villa as a "bombshell" contestant on Day 15 and coupled up with Adam Collard, before being dumped from the villa ten days later. In October 2019, McDermott took part in The X Factor: Celebrity as part of No Love Lost, a group which featured her Love Island co-stars Eyal Booker, Samira Mighty and Wes Nelson. They were mentored by Louis Walsh and finished in eighth place. The same month, McDermott began appearing as a cast member on the E4 reality series Made in Chelsea, alongside Thompson. She made her last appearance on the show in December 2020.

In February 2021, McDermott appeared in her own BBC documentary, Zara McDermott: Revenge Porn, which saw her recall the experience of having her nude photos leaked as a teenager. She later appeared in a follow up documentary, Zara McDermott: Uncovering Rape Culture, in November, which saw McDermott draw on her own experience of almost being raped. In March 2022, McDermott began presenting Love in the Flesh on BBC Three. The premise of the show featured couples who had only ever spoken online, meeting in person for the first time.

Filmography

Awards and nominations

References

External links
 

1996 births
21st-century English women singers
21st-century English singers
English female models
English television presenters
Living people
People from the London Borough of Havering
Television personalities from Essex
The X Factor (British TV series) contestants
Love Island (2015 TV series) contestants